Mercy High School is a private, Roman Catholic high school in Red Bluff, California.  It is located in the Roman Catholic Diocese of Sacramento.

Background
Mercy High School was established in 1882 as Our Lady of Mercy Academy by the Sisters of Mercy.  It became Mercy High School when it moved to its present location in 1959.

Mercy has a long history of great sports and academics.

In 2020 it was scheduled to close; however a plan was proposed in which the school would remain as a distance learning school where students access courses via computer from their local parishes.

References

External links
 School Website

Red Bluff, California
Schools in Tehama County, California
Catholic secondary schools in California
Roman Catholic Diocese of Sacramento
Sisters of Mercy schools
Educational institutions established in 1882
1882 establishments in California